Wyatt Johnston (born May 14, 2003) is a Canadian professional ice hockey centre who plays for the Dallas Stars of the National Hockey League (NHL). Johnston was selected in the first round of the 2021 NHL Entry Draft by the Stars with the 23rd overall pick.

Personal life 
Johnston was born in Toronto, Ontario on May 14, 2003, to Margot and Chuck Johnston.

Playing career

Junior
Johnston finished his career with the Toronto Marlboros in the GTHL in 2018–19. He put up 48 goals and 46 assists for 94 points during his final year with the team.

He was drafted sixth overall by the Windsor Spitfires during the 2019 OHL Priority Selection draft. In his rookie season in 2019–20, Johnston scored his first OHL goal on September 21, 2019 against the Peterborough Petes in a 9–6 victory. Johnston went on to score 12 goals and 18 assists for 30 points in 53 games in his rookie year before the season was cancelled due to the COVID-19 pandemic.

In returning to the Windsor Spitfires for the 2021–22 season, Johnston led the league and the entire CHL in scoring in the regular season with 124 points in 68 regular season games. He also led the OHL in playoff points, registering 41 through 25 games, before losing in the finals in a game 7 defeat to the Hamilton Bulldogs.

Dallas Stars

Johnston was drafted 23rd overall in the first round by the Dallas Stars during the 2021 NHL Entry Draft. He signed a three-year, entry-level contract with the Stars on September 28, 2021. He put up 2 goals and 1 assist in the Dallas Stars Prospects Tournament.

Johnston made his NHL debut in the Stars' first game of the season on October 13, 2022, against the Nashville Predators. He became the first teenager to play for the Stars since Miro Heiskanen in 2018 and first North-American teenager to do so since 1994 (Jamie Langenbrunner and Todd Harvey). Johnston scored his first NHL goal in his first NHL game against Juuse Saros.

Career statistics

Regular season and playoffs

International

Awards and honours

References

External links
 

2003 births
Living people
Canadian ice hockey centres
Canadian ice hockey defencemen
Dallas Stars draft picks
Dallas Stars players
National Hockey League first-round draft picks
Ice hockey people from Toronto
Toronto Marlboros players
Windsor Spitfires players